A list of the earliest films produced in the Cinema of France between 1892 and 1909 ordered by year of release. For an A-Z list of French films see :Category:French films

1890s

1900s

See also
 1892 in France
 1895 in France
 1896 in France
 1898 in France
 1899 in France
 1900 in France
 1901 in France
 1902 in France
 1903 in France
 1904 in France
 1905 in France
 1906 in France
 1907 in France

External links
 French film at the Internet Movie Database

1910s
Films
French
Films
French